South Hertfordshire was a constituency in Hertfordshire which returned one Member of Parliament (MP)  to the House of Commons of the Parliament of the United Kingdom.  It was created for the February 1974 general election and abolished for the 1983 general election when it was mainly replaced by the new Hertsmere constituency.

Boundaries 
Statutory definition
The Urban District of Potters Bar, 
the Rural District of Elstree, 
in the Rural District of St Albans the parishes of Colney Heath, London Colney, and St Stephen, and 
in the Rural District of Watford the parish of Aldenham.

Components' immediate predecessor seats
The land of the Urban District of Potters Bar in local government administration-abolished Middlesex has been in Hertfordshire since the creation of Greater London in 1965. It now moved into this new seat from the abolished Enfield West seat. 

The Rural District of Elstree was in the abolished Barnet seat. 

The three St Albans district parishes came from the very long-lived St Albans seat and Aldenham came from South West Hertfordshire.

Components' immediate successors
Colney Heath was went back to St Albans seat and St Stephen transferred to the Watford seat. 

The rest formed most of the new County Constituency of Hertsmere.

Members of Parliament

Election results

References 

South Hertfordshire
Constituencies of the Parliament of the United Kingdom established in 1974
Constituencies of the Parliament of the United Kingdom disestablished in 1983